Love Kickoff (南華夢飛翔) is a 2-hour long Hong Kong television movie created by TVB in 2009. The movie revolves around several teenagers playing soccer, hoping for a chance to compete with the South China Athletic Association team. Love Kickoff is part of the Heart of Fencing TVB series and guest stars many TVB actors and singers throughout the show.

Cast
Dominic Ho as Goal
Lee Ho as Jay
Ronald Law as Wood
Dada Lo as Monique (Big Mon)
Liddy Li as Small Mon
Joey Law as Alexander
Hsu Pei-yu as Fiona
Hui Siu Hung as Uncle Hung
Phoebe Chan as Ah So
Phoebe Chan as Phoebe
Coson Leung as Dick
Robbie Keane as Himself
Kwok Wing Kiu as Cheerleader
Yuri Chan as Cheerleader
Kibby Lau as Cheerleader
Janice Ting as Cheerleader
Lukian Wang as Cheerleader

Guests

Hong Kong television shows